This article details men's professional association football club records and statistics in Oceania.

Individual records

Most goals in a season
In the 2020–21 season, Joses Nawo became the player with the most goals scored in a single season with 35 goals for the Henderson Eels. He passed Sasho Petrovski's tally of 34 goals from the 2000–01 season.

 All records happened while the players' clubs in top-flight domestic league
 *: No domestic cup competition held
 **: No Oceania football competition

Club records

Most consecutive national league titles
Source:
 15 – Tafea (1994–2009)
 11 – Lotohaʻapai United (1998–2008)
 11 – Nauti (1980–1990)
 10 – Nauti (2007–2016)
 9 – Titikaveka (1971–1979)
 8 – Hekari United (2006–2014)
 8 – Central Sport (1972–1979)

Highest goal margin in Oceania Club Championship
 16 – Central United 16–0 Lotoha'apai in 1999 Oceania Club Championship
 16 – Lotoha'apai 0–16 Wollongong Wolves in 2001 Oceania Club Championship

Notes

References

Association football club records and statistics
Association football in Oceania